Plutonium selenide is a binary inorganic compound of plutonium and selenium with the chemical formula PuSe. The compound forms black crystals and does not dissolve in water.

Synthesis
Reaction of diplutonium triselenide and plutonium trihydride:

Fusion of stoichiometric amounts of pure substances:

Properties
Plutonium selenide forms black crystals of a cubic system, space group Fmm, cell parameters a = 0.57934 nm, Z = 4, structure of the NaCl type.

With increasing pressure, two phase transitions occur: at 20 GPa into the trigonal system and at 35 GPa into the cubic system, a structure of the CsCl type.

Does not dissolve in water.

Magnetic susceptibility follows Curie-Weiss law.

References

Inorganic compounds
Plutonium compounds
Selenides
Rock salt crystal structure